This is a list of 145 species in Augochloropsis, a genus of sweat bees in the family Halictidae.

Augochloropsis species

 Augochloropsis acidalia (Smith, 1879) i c g
 Augochloropsis acis (Smith, 1879) i c g
 Augochloropsis aglaia (Holmberg, 1903) i c g
 Augochloropsis anesidora (Doering, 1875) i c g
 Augochloropsis angularis (Vachal, 1903) i c g
 Augochloropsis anisitsi (Schrottky, 1908) i c g
 Augochloropsis anonyma (Cockerell, 1922) i c g b
 Augochloropsis anquisita (Cockerell, 1913) i c g
 Augochloropsis anticlea (Schrottky, 1908) i c g
 Augochloropsis apsidialis (Vachal, 1903) i c g
 Augochloropsis argentina (Friese, 1908) i c g
 Augochloropsis aspricordis (Vachal, 1904) i c g
 Augochloropsis atripyga Strand, 1910 i c g
 Augochloropsis atropilosa (Friese, 1925) i c g
 Augochloropsis atropos (Smith, 1879) i c g
 Augochloropsis atropurpurea (Moure, 1940) i c g
 Augochloropsis aureocuprea (Friese, 1910) i c g
 Augochloropsis auriferina Michener, 1954 i c g
 Augochloropsis aurifluens (Vachal, 1903) i c g
 Augochloropsis aurinota Strand, 1910 i c g
 Augochloropsis auriventris (Friese, 1921) i c g
 Augochloropsis bari (Dominique, 1898) i c g
 Augochloropsis barticana (Cockerell, 1923) i c g
 Augochloropsis batesi (Cockerell, 1900) i c g
 Augochloropsis berenice (Smith, 1879) i c g
 Augochloropsis bertonii (Schrottky, 1909) i c g
 Augochloropsis brachycephala Moure, 1943 i c g
 Augochloropsis brethesi (Vachal, 1903) i c g
 Augochloropsis bruchi (Schrottky, 1908) i c
 Augochloropsis caerulans (Vachal, 1903) i c g
 Augochloropsis callichlorura (Cockerell, 1918) i c g
 Augochloropsis callichroa (Cockerell, 1900) i c g
 Augochloropsis calypso (Smith, 1879) i c g
 Augochloropsis catamarcensis (Schrottky, 1909) i c g
 Augochloropsis cataractae (Cockerell, 1930) i c g
 Augochloropsis celaeno Schrottky, 1906 i c g
 Augochloropsis charapina (Cockerell, 1913) i c g
 Augochloropsis chloera (Moure, 1940) i c g
 Augochloropsis cholas (Vachal, 1903) i c g
 Augochloropsis cirrhopus (Vachal, 1903) i c g
 Augochloropsis cleopatra (Schrottky, 1902) i c g
 Augochloropsis cockerelli Schrottky, 1909 i c g
 Augochloropsis cognata Moure, 1944 i c g
 Augochloropsis crassiceps Moure, 1947 i c g
 Augochloropsis crassigena Moure, 1943 i c g
 Augochloropsis cupreola (Cockerell, 1900) i c g
 Augochloropsis cupreotincta (Cockerell, 1900) i c g
 Augochloropsis cyanea (Schrottky, 1901) i c g
 Augochloropsis cyaneitarsis Strand, 1910 i c g
 Augochloropsis cyanescens (Friese, 1917) i c g
 Augochloropsis cyclis (Vachal, 1903) i c g
 Augochloropsis cytherea (Smith, 1853) i c g
 Augochloropsis danielis Strand, 1910 i c g
 Augochloropsis deianira (Schrottky, 1910) i c g
 Augochloropsis dirhipis (Vachal, 1903) i c g
 Augochloropsis discors (Vachal, 1903) i c g
 Augochloropsis diversipennis (Lepeletier, 1841) i c g
 Augochloropsis drepanis (Vachal, 1903) i c g
 Augochloropsis electra (Smith, 1853) i c g
 Augochloropsis epipyrgitis (Holmberg, 1903) i c g
 Augochloropsis eucalypso (Cockerell, 1900) i c g
 Augochloropsis euterpe (Holmberg, 1886) i c g
 Augochloropsis evibrissata Moure, 1943 i c g
 Augochloropsis fairchildi Michener, 1954 i c g
 Augochloropsis flammea (Smith, 1861) i c g
 Augochloropsis gemmicauda (Cockerell, 1931) i c g
 Augochloropsis guaranitica Strand, 1910 i c g
 Augochloropsis hebescens (Smith, 1879) i c g
 Augochloropsis heterochroa (Cockerell, 1900) i c g
 Augochloropsis holmbergi (Schrottky, 1910) i c g
 Augochloropsis horticola Strand, 1910 i c g
 Augochloropsis huebneri (Alfken, 1930) i c g
 Augochloropsis hypsipyle (Schrottky, 1909) i c g
 Augochloropsis ignita (Smith, 1861) i c g
 Augochloropsis illustris (Vachal, 1903) i c g
 Augochloropsis imperialis (Vachal, 1903) i c g
 Augochloropsis iris (Schrottky, 1902) i c g
 Augochloropsis isabelae Engel, 2008 i c g
 Augochloropsis janeirensis (Cockerell, 1900) i c g
 Augochloropsis johannae (Friese, 1917) i c g
 Augochloropsis juani Strand, 1910 i c g
 Augochloropsis laeta (Smith, 1879) i c g
 Augochloropsis leontodes (Vachal, 1904) i c g
 Augochloropsis leurotricha Moure, 1943 i c g
 Augochloropsis liopelte (Moure, 1940) i c g
 Augochloropsis luederwaldti (Moure, 1940) i c g
 Augochloropsis maroniana (Cockerell, 1918) i c g
 Augochloropsis melanochaeta Moure, 1950 i c g
 Augochloropsis mesomelas (Vachal, 1904) i c g
 Augochloropsis metallica (Fabricius, 1793) i c g b
 Augochloropsis monochroa (Cockerell, 1900) i c g
 Augochloropsis montensis (Vachal, 1903) i c g
 Augochloropsis moreirae (Cockerell, 1900) i c g
 Augochloropsis multiplex (Vachal, 1903) i c g
 Augochloropsis nasigerella Strand, 1910 i c g
 Augochloropsis nasuta Moure, 1944 i c g
 Augochloropsis nigra Moure, 1944 i c g
 Augochloropsis nitidicollis (Vachal, 1903) i c g
 Augochloropsis nothus (Cockerell, 1914) i c g
 Augochloropsis notophops (Cockerell, 1913) i c g
 Augochloropsis notophos (Vachal, 1903) i c g
 Augochloropsis ornata (Smith, 1879) i c g
 Augochloropsis pallitarsis (Friese, 1917) i c g
 Augochloropsis pandrosos (Schrottky, 1909) i c g
 Augochloropsis paphia (Smith, 1853) i c g
 Augochloropsis patens (Vachal, 1903) i c g
 Augochloropsis pendens (Vachal, 1903) i c g
 Augochloropsis pentheres (Vachal, 1903) i c g
 Augochloropsis perimede (Schrottky, 1908) i c g
 Augochloropsis pomona (Holmberg, 1903) i c g
 Augochloropsis prognatha Moure, 1944 i c g
 Augochloropsis pronoticalis Strand, 1910 i c g
 Augochloropsis proserpina (Brèthes, 1909) i c g
 Augochloropsis quadrans (Vachal, 1903) i c g
 Augochloropsis quadripectinata Strand, 1910 i c g
 Augochloropsis quinquepectinata Strand, 1910 i c g
 Augochloropsis refulgens (Smith, 1861) i c g
 Augochloropsis rotalis (Vachal, 1903) i c g
 Augochloropsis rufisetis (Vachal, 1903) i c g
 Augochloropsis selloi (Vachal, 1911) i c g
 Augochloropsis semele (Schrottky, 1902) i c g
 Augochloropsis semilaeta (Cockerell, 1923) i c g
 Augochloropsis semiramis (Jörgensen, 1912) i c g
 Augochloropsis sexpectinata Strand, 1910 i c g
 Augochloropsis smithiana (Cockerell, 1900) i c g
 Augochloropsis sparsalis (Vachal, 1903) i c g
 Augochloropsis spinolae (Cockerell, 1900) i c g
 Augochloropsis splendida (Smith, 1853) i c g
 Augochloropsis sthena Schrottky, 1906 i c g
 Augochloropsis sumptuosa (Smith, 1853) i c g b
 Augochloropsis sympleres (Vachal, 1903) i c g
 Augochloropsis taurifrons (Vachal, 1903) i c g
 Augochloropsis terrestris (Vachal, 1903) i c g
 Augochloropsis toralis (Vachal, 1904) i c g
 Augochloropsis trinitatis (Cockerell, 1925) i c g
 Augochloropsis tupacamaru (Holmberg, 1884) i c g
 Augochloropsis varians (Vachal, 1903) i c g
 Augochloropsis versicolor (Schrottky, 1908) i c g
 Augochloropsis vesta (Smith, 1853) i c g
 Augochloropsis villana Strand, 1910 i c g
 Augochloropsis viridana (Smith, 1861) i c g
 Augochloropsis viridilustrans (Cockerell, 1927) i c g
 Augochloropsis vivax (Smith, 1879) i c g
 Augochloropsis wallacei (Cockerell, 1900) i c g
 Augochloropsis zikani Moure, 1944 i c g

Data sources: i = ITIS, c = Catalogue of Life, g = GBIF, b = Bugguide.net

References

Augochloropsis
Articles created by Qbugbot